Eduru is a village in West Godavari district in the state of Andhra Pradesh in India. The nearest railway station is at Krishnapatnam (KAPT) located at a distance of 15.83 Km

Demographics
 India census, Eduru has a population of 2323 of which 1192 are males while 1131 are females. The average sex ratio of Eduru village is 949. The child population is 384, which makes up 9.99% of the total population of the village, with sex ratio 983. In 2011, the literacy rate of Eduru village was 74.61% when compared to 67.02% of Andhra Pradesh.

See also 
 Eluru

References 

Villages in West Godavari district